Nasr Taha Mustafa is a Yemeni journalist and politician. He is currently the President's Advisor for Media and Cultural Affairs. He quit his position as Head of the State News Agency (Saba) and his position as a ruling party member on 19 March 2011 after the Friday of Dignity massacre committed by the regime then during the 2011 Yemeni uprising.

He served in key government and non-government positions as follows:

He has published four books:

References

Sources

21st-century Yemeni politicians
Living people
20th-century Yemeni journalists
1962 births
Information ministers of Yemen
20th-century Yemeni writers
21st-century Yemeni writers
21st-century Yemeni journalists